Charlotte Nooth was an Irish poet who published her works in the early 19th century. Nooth's dates are uncertain, though she is thought to have been born in the 18th century, possibly in the north of Ireland. This is based purely on the fact that some of her poems are written in northern Irish dialect.

Selected works
 Original Poems, Including Ballads, Written in the Dialect of the Northern Parts of Ireland, With a Play, entitled Clare; or, the Nuns of Charity, in Verse, London, 1815.
 Eglantine; or the Family of Fortescue, 2 volumes, London, 1816.

References

 Dictionary of Nineteenth-Century Irish Women Poets, pp. 169, Anne Ulry Colman, Kenny's Bookshop, Galway, 1996. .

Irish poets
Year of death unknown
Year of birth unknown